The 2022 European 25/50 m Events Championships was organised by the European Shooting Confederation and held in Polish city of Wrocław.

The championships also served as qualification event for 2024 Summer Olympics and 2023 European Games.

Senior

Rifle events

Pistol events

Junior

Rifle events

Pistol events

Medal table

Seniors

Juniors

Olympic quotas

References

External links
 

European Shooting Championships
European Shooting Championships
2022 in Polish sport
European 25/50 m Championships
International sports competitions hosted by Poland